The 1979 WBF World Championships took place in June 1979 in Hangzhou, China. It was one of the two editions of the world championships organised by the WBF, which was a rival body of the Badminton World Federation.

Medalists

Final stage

Men's singles

Women's singles

Men's doubles

Women's doubles

Mixed doubles

Medal table

Footnotes

External links 
 http://newspapers.nl.sg/Digitised/Page/straitstimes19790622.1.32.aspx

1979
1979 in badminton
Badminton tournaments in China
Sport in Hangzhou
1979 in Chinese sport